Hugues Roger (born 20 October 1940) is a French sprinter. He competed in the men's 4 × 400 metres relay at the 1976 Summer Olympics.

References

1940 births
Living people
Athletes (track and field) at the 1976 Summer Olympics
French male sprinters
Olympic athletes of France
Place of birth missing (living people)